Jakob Edvard Colbjørnsen (19 November 1744 - 13 February 1802) was a Norwegian-Danish jurist who served as Chief Justice of the Supreme Court of Denmark (Da. Højesteret, Nor. Høyesterett).

Jakob Edvard Colbjørnsen was born at Sørum in Akershus, Norway. He was raised in the traditional region of Romerike. His parents were Colbjørn Colbjørnsen Jacobsen (1714-1761) and Anna Dorothea Røring (1710-1772).  Jakob Edvard Colbjørnsen, along with his brothers, Edvard Røring Colbjørnsen (1751–1792), Christian Colbjørnsen attended the Christiania Cathedral School.

He studied law at the University of Copenhagen. Subsequently, he served as a professor of law at the University of Copenhagen and later as extraordinary assessor in the Supreme Court. He served as the chief justice from 1799 until his death in 1802. His brother, Christian Colbjørnsen was chief justice of Denmark-Norway from 1804 until 1814.

References

1744 births
1802 deaths
People from Akershus
People educated at Oslo Cathedral School
University of Copenhagen alumni
Academic staff of the University of Copenhagen
19th-century Norwegian people
Chief justices of Denmark–Norway
18th-century Danish judges
Norwegian jurists